Nyan may be the name of the following people:
 Ba Nyan (1897–1945), Burmese painter
 Chong Hon Nyan (born 1924), Malaysian politician
 Dougbeh Chris Nyan, Liberian medic and activist
 Nyan Boateng (born 1985), American football player
 Nyan Tun Aung (born 1948), Burmese politician, Minister for Transport of Myanmar
 Nyan Tun (born 1954), Burmese politician
 Nyan Win (born 1953), Burmese politician, Chief Minister of Bago Region from 2011 to 2016
 Nyan Win (NLD) (1942–2021), Burmese politician and Aung San Suu Kyi's personal attorney
 Ousman Nyan (born 1975), Norwegian footballer

See also 
 "Nyan", the Japanese word for "meow"
 Nyan Wheti, an ancient land route in British Columbia, Canada
 Nyan Cat, a YouTube video and internet meme of 2011